Amette is a surname. Notable people with the surname include: 

Jacques-Pierre Amette (born 1943), French writer
Léon-Adolphe Amette (1850–1920), French Catholic cardinal